"I Get Along" is a song by English synth-pop duo Pet Shop Boys, released on 15 July 2002 as the second single from their eighth studio album, Release (2002). A love song, Neil Tennant has also hinted that it can also be interpreted as commentary on the then fraught relationship between British prime minister Tony Blair and New Labour architect Peter Mandelson after the latter had to resign again from the British Cabinet after a second major scandal he was involved in.

The song, like its parent album, also stands in contrast to the Pet Shop Boys' predominantly electronic catalogue of songs, primarily having a pop/soft rock feel, opening with a piano, and featuring rock-style guitar and drums (even if synthesised). There is only sparse actual synthesised sounds in the song.

The video, which portrays young actors in a New York City artist's studio and does not draw on the song's political subtext, was directed by Bruce Weber, who had worked with the band before, most notably for their video for the 1990 single "Being Boring". It also features a rare appearance of Tennant playing an acoustic guitar.

Release
The radio edit of "I Get Along" omits the third verse of the song, which partially reprises the first verse.

UK single releases followed the pattern set by "Home and Dry" previously, with two CD singles and a DVD single. The cover of each displayed a pie chart, labeled "Fig. 01", "Fig. 02", and "Fig. 03" respectively. As a non-sequitur, the sectors of the charts are captioned with the personal thoughts of one or more unidentified people.

"I Get Along" is the only Pet Shop Boys single to date with no remixes produced, so a promotional 12-inch single was not released. In the Pet Shop Boys' fanclub magazine, it is said that David Bowie and Marilyn Manson were both approached to do remixes, but there was not enough time for them to be done.

In 2012 the Pet Shop Boys wrote and composed the song Listening for Norwegian pop singer Morten Harket's solo album Out of My Hands. The song reuses certain elements of the melody and the outro of I Get Along.

Track listings
All tracks written by Tennant, Lowe unless noted.

UK CD single 1 (CDRS 6581)
 "I Get Along" (radio edit)
 "Searching for the Face of Jesus" 
 "Between Two Islands" (Tennant, Lowe, Ware, Ross)
 "I Get Along" (music video)

 "Between Two Islands" gives credit to Ware and Ross as it includes a lyric from the Marvin Gaye song "I Want You".

UK CD single 2 (CDR 6581)
 "I Get Along" (live)
 "A Red Letter Day" (live)
 "Love Comes Quickly" (live) (Tennant, Lowe, Hague)

UK DVD single (DVDR 6581)
 "I Get Along/E-Mail" (music video)
 "Friendly Fire"
 "Home and Dry" (Blank & Jones vocal)

Charts

References

2002 singles
2002 songs
Parlophone singles
Pet Shop Boys songs
Songs written by Chris Lowe
Songs written by Neil Tennant